Shuanggudui is an archeological site located near Fuyang in China's Anhui province. Shuanggudui grave no. 1, which belongs to Xiahou Zao, the second marquis of Ruyin, was sealed in 165 BCE in the early Han dynasty (206 BCE – 220 CE). Excavated in 1977, it was found to contain a large number of texts written on bamboo strips, including fragments of the Classic of Poetry and the Songs of the South, a text on breathing exercises, a "year table" recounting historical events, a manual on dogs, a version of the I Ching (Yijing) that differs from the received one, and artifacts including the oldest known cosmic board, a divinatory instrument. Like Mawangdui and Guodian, two other tombs from the area of the old state of Chu, the Shuanggudui find has shed great light on the culture and practices of the early Han dynasty.

Excavation and identification

Shuanggudui (literally "paired ancient tumuli") was excavated in July 1977 during the expansion of the Fuyang municipal airport in Anhui province, China. Located about two miles outside Fuyang at the time, the site was known to contain old tombs, yet it is unclear whether the excavation was pre-planned or rushed just as construction started. The digging was supervised by two archeologists from the Anhui Provincial Archaeological Relics Find Team, who discovered two tombs, one of which (Tomb 1, to the east) was found to contain texts and artifacts.

Some of the bronze artifacts found in Tomb 1 were marked with the name of the tomb's occupant Ruyin Hou, which means "Lord of Ruyin". This title had first been granted to Xiahou Ying (d. 172 BCE), who had helped Liu Bang (r. 202–195 BCE) to establish the Han dynasty. Archeologists have identified the tomb as belonging to Ying's son Xiahou Zao, the second Lord of Ruyin. Little is known about him, except that he died seven years after his father. The tomb is therefore thought to have been sealed in 165 BCE, the fifteenth year of Emperor Wen's reign.

Artifacts

Cosmic boards
The Shuanggudui tomb contained the earliest known diviner's boards (shi ), or "cosmographs", divinatory instruments that were widely used during the Han dynasty (206 BCE – 220 AD). These two lacquered astrological boards consist of a movable disk –  in diameter – representing the Heavens mounted on a square base –  – representing Earth. The center of the circular top depicts the seven stars of the Northern Dipper (which was considered to be a powerful astral deity), whereas the rim of both the disk and the square base is inscribed with astro-calendrical signs that helped to perform divination. Donald Harper, who wrote about this artifact soon after its discovery, argued that it should be called "cosmic board" because it is "so obviously a mechanistic model of the cosmos itself".

The use of such boards is described or alluded to in many ancient Chinese texts like the Chu Ci, Han Feizi, Huainanzi, and some military texts. The diviner would rotate the disk until the Dipper pointed in a chosen direction, usually corresponding to the current date. He would then find an answer to his question by means of numerological calculations. Manipulation of this miniature model of the cosmos was supposed to bring power to its user.

Numeral juxtaposition on the inner, round part of the board correlates to the Luoshu layout which was long supposed to have been invented in the Six Dynasties (220–589). This is the most ancient occurrence of the magic square Luoshu. "The inscriptions ...  appear to belong to ... the 'Circulation of Taiyi among the Nine Palaces' (Taiyi xing jiugong 太一行九宮)."

Other objects
The most valuable goods that were buried with the tomb's occupant had long been robbed when archeologists excavated the tomb in 1977. In addition to the two cosmic boards, many lacquered vessels were nonetheless found, as well as terra cotta musical instruments, metallic weapons (a few made of iron but most of bronze), and a number of bronze artifacts like a mirror, a lamp, and a cauldron.

Texts

Bamboo strips
Robbers who looted the tomb in the late second century CE took the bamboo strips out of the lacquered bamboo hamper in which they had been placed and left the strips on the ground of the coffin chamber. The chamber itself later collapsed, breaking the strips, and muddy water covered the strips, eventually turning them into "paper-thin sheets, fused together into clumps by ground pressure." To complicate matters, the 1977 excavation took place under a heavy rainstorm, and the pump that the excavators used to remove mud from the coffin chamber also pumped out other fragments of bamboo strips.

It took a team led by Han Ziqiang of the Fuyang Local Museum and Yu Haoliang (1917–1982) of the Bureau of Cultural Relics in Beijing almost two years just to separate the surviving fragments. They first removed mud from the clumps by soaking them in a "weak vinegar solution", then baked them to remove moisture. Next, they detached the thin and extremely brittle fragments of strips from the clumps one by one and photographed each piece. Historian Edward Shaughnessy, who has worked on some of the Shuanggudui texts, finds it "miraculous" that they could be reconstructed from such damaged material.

After Yu Haoliang's death in 1982, Hu Pingsheng replaced him at the head of the team. It is Hu and Han Ziqiang who edited the texts for publication.

Classic of Changes
The longest text found in Shuanggudui is an incomplete version of the Yijing, or Classic of Changes, in 752 fragments containing 3,119 characters. The hexagram and line statements of the Shuanggudui text closely resemble the received version, yet it is too fragmentary to reconstruct the complete text of any single hexagram or even the sequence in which they were presented.

Nearly two thirds of this Shuanggudui Yijing consist in "formulaic divination statements" that are present neither in the received Yijing, nor in the version that was found in Mawangdui that was also sealed in the 160s BCE. Edward Shaughnessy has hypothesized that the line statements of the received Book of Changes may have originated in similar but older divination statements.

Classic of Poetry
More than 170 fragments of the Classic of Poetry or Book of Odes, for a total of 820 characters, have also been found in Shuanggudui. These fragments are longer and have been more extensively studied than other incomplete versions of the Shijing found in ancient tombs like those of Guodian (tomb sealed around 300 BCE) and Mawangdui (168 BCE).

The Shuanggudui version contains portions of 65 songs from the "Airs of States" (Guofeng ) section and 4 from the "Xiaoya"  section. Although the song titles are the same as those of the received version, the text varies substantially from that of the other early Han versions. Since each strip contained one stanza (zhang ), characters were written smaller when a long stanza had to fit on a single strip.

Cangjiepian
Named after the mythical inventor of Chinese writing, the Cangjiepian or Cang Jie Wordbook was one of the earliest primers of Chinese characters. It was first compiled by Li Si (ca. 280–208 BCE) – an important statesman of the Qin dynasty who wanted to use it to support his policies of language unification – and later augmented with two other works. The Shuanggudui version counts 541 characters, a little less than 20 percent of the complete work. It is longer and more legible than the fragments of the same work that were found in Juyan  (at the confines of Inner Mongolia and Gansu), and among the Dunhuang manuscripts. Its presence in several early Han tombs shows that the Cang Jie Pian "was, if not a common manual for elementary instruction, at least not a rare work."

Wanwu
The text that Chinese editors have titled "Myriad Things" or "Ten Thousand Things" (Wanwu ) is an extensive list of natural substances that historians of Chinese medicine see as a precursor of later Chinese herbology, or literature on materia medica like the Shennong bencao jing. It explains how to use some substances for healing purposes, but also contains technical information on how to catch animals or expel vermin. In the words of historian Donald Harper, this work "catalogues human curiosity about the products of nature," noting among other things that pinellia can fatten pigs and that "a horse-gullet tube can be used to breathe under water." The names of drugs and illnesses found in Wanwu correspond with those found in the Recipes for Fifty-Two Ailments, a text dating from about 200 BCE that was buried in a tomb in Mawangdui in 168 BCE. These and other correspondences between the two texts show that the same knowledge of drugs was circulating in both the southern Chu region (Mawangdui) and the Yangzi River valley (Shuanggudui).

Historical annals
The most fragmentary and badly damaged of the texts found in Shuanggudui is a text that the Chinese editors have called "Table" (biao ), an annalistic compilation of events from about 850 to the end of the third century BCE, that is, from the late Western Zhou through the Spring and Autumn period and the Warring States. Some of the strips still carry the horizontal markers that divided the text into rows. The existence of this chronological "Table" in the early second century BCE shows that Sima Qian did not invent this mode of historical representation, as he often gave the impression in his magnum opus the Shiji.

Breathing exercises
An incomplete text dealing with breathing exercises was also excavated in Shuanggudui. Modern editors have named it xingqi , or Moving the Vapors. Along with similar texts found in Mawangdui, Zhangjiashan, and Shuihudi, it testifies to the widespread existence of gymnastic practices in Han times.

Manual on dogs
The tomb also contained a Classic for Physiognomizing Dogs (Xiang Gou Jing ), "a text for assessing the qualities of dogs." It has been compared to another text on dogs from Yinqueshan (tomb sealed in the second half of the second century BCE) and to a work on the physiognomy of horses that was excavated from a grave in Mawangdui (sealed in 168 BCE).

Other fragments
Fragments of the following texts were also found in the tomb:
Eight bamboo strips bearing 56 characters from the "Miscellaneous Chapters" (Zapian ) of the Zhuangzi.
A handbook for government officials that the modern editors have named Zuowu Yuancheng , or Per Capita Rate for Work Duties. This manual gives the "standard rates of work for different tasks to be carried out by farmers and artisans".
Almanacs (rishu  or "day books") and other divinatory texts similar to those that were found in other graves such as Yinqueshan.
Ninety-six strips bearing a text resembling the Chunqiu Shiyu  (Stories and Sayings of the Spring and Autumn) excavated in Mawangdui.
Three "wooden boards" (du ) each bearing the table of contents of one book. One is the Chunqiu Shiyu (see previous entry), and the most complete one is called Rujiazhe Yan  (Sayings of the Ru School), close in content to the Kongzi Jiayu  (School Sayings of Confucius), which has been transmitted to the present.

See also
 Chu Silk Manuscript
 Fangmatan
 Guodian Chu Slips
 Mawangdui Silk Texts
 Shuihudi Qin bamboo texts
 Tsinghua Slips
 Yinqueshan Han Slips
 Zhangjiashan Han bamboo texts

Notes

Bibliography

Works cited

Further reading

 

2nd-century BC manuscripts
1977 archaeological discoveries
Archaeological artifacts of China
Archaeological corpora
Chinese classic texts
Chinese manuscripts
Han dynasty texts
Fuyang